This is a List of Tudor rebellions, referring to various movements which attempted to resist the authority of the Tudor monarchs, who ruled over England and parts of Ireland between 1485 and 1603. Some of these were the product of religious grievances (for example Wyatt's Rebellion), some were regional or ethnic in nature (e.g. the Cornish Rebellion of 1497), though most combined an element of both (such as the Prayer Book Rebellion in the West Country of England and the Desmond Rebellions in southern Ireland).

The last and greatest of the major Tudor rebellions was Tyrone's Rebellion, more commonly referred to as the Nine Years' War.

Chronology of Tudor Rebellions: 1486–1601
1486      - Stafford and Lovell Rebellion
1486–7    - Simnel Rebellion
1489      - Yorkshire Rebellion
1497      - Warbeck Rebellion
1497      - Cornish Rebellion of 1497
1497      - Second Cornish Uprising of 1497
1525      - Amicable Grant
1534–7    - Silken Thomas Rebellion (Kildare Rebellion)
1536–7    - Pilgrimage of Grace
1537      - Bigod's rebellion
1549      - Prayer Book Rebellion (Western)
1549      - Buckinghamshire and Oxfordshire rising
1549      - Kett's Rebellion
1553      - Northumberland Rebellion
1554      - Wyatt's rebellion
1558–67   - Shane O'Neill Rebellion
1569      - Rising of the North (Northern Earls)
1569–73   - First Desmond Rebellion (Munster)
1579–83   - Second Desmond Rebellion (Geraldine)
1593–1603 - Tyrone's Rebellion (Nine Years' War)
1596      - Oxfordshire Rebellion
1601      - Essex Rebellion

References
 (see Chronology section in Preface)
 (Chapter 1, Section "Tudor rebellions - a timeline")

Tudor Rebellions
Tudor Rebellions

Military history of England
Wars involving England
Tudor rebellions